Poecilus lucublandus is a species of woodland ground beetle in the family Carabidae. It is found in North America.

Subspecies
These two subspecies belong to the species Poecilus lucublandus:
 Poecilus lucublandus lucublandus
 Poecilus lucublandus manhattanis Casey

References

Further reading

External links

 

Pterostichinae
Articles created by Qbugbot
Beetles described in 1823